Hubert Walter Ramsey (3 October 1874 – 8 February 1968) was a British lacrosse player who competed in the 1908 Summer Olympics. He was part of the British team which won the silver medal.

References

External links
Hubert Ramsey's profile at Sports Reference.com
Hubert Ramsey at the National Archives

1874 births
1968 deaths
Lacrosse players at the 1908 Summer Olympics
Olympic lacrosse players of Great Britain
Olympic silver medallists for Great Britain
Stockbrokers
People from Tottenham
Medalists at the 1908 Summer Olympics
Olympic medalists in lacrosse
20th-century British people